Tyneside Songs  (or to give it its full title "Tyneside Songs Volume (here the number is stated) with pianoforte accompaniment – by C. E. Catcheside-Warrington – Copyright – (published by) J. G. Windows Ltd., Central Arcade, Newcastle – Printed in England") is a Chapbook of Geordie folk songs consisting of four volumes, first published 1912 and 1913. As it stated on the cover, the publications were compiled and edited by Charles Ernest Catcheside-Warrington.

The books cost initially 2/= (Two Shillings). A further reprint was carried out in 1927, when a price of 3/= (Three Shillings) was printed on the front of the book. Many of this reprint had a red star shaped sticker placed on the front showing that the selling price was in fact 3/6 (Three Shillings and Six Pence). A further reprint was done in the middle 1950s. The later editions were renamed "Album of Tyneside Songs with pianoforte accompaniment".

This collection is important as the songs are all important traditional standards and that they are arranged in the "parlor" performance style representing the classic tradition as opposed to "music hall"

The publication 
Charles Ernest Catcheside-Warrington.edited the four volumes of "Tyneside Songs", a series of small booklets each of around 26 pages long, containing mainly well-known songs, by well-known Tyneside composers.

The contents of these volumes now have a great historical value in that we are able to learn of the types of music popular at (and sometimes, many years before) the time of publication.

Contents 

(All lyrics/notation available here:* Tyneside Songs-Catcheside Warrington

The volumes and their contents are below :-

See also 
Geordie dialect words
Charles Ernest Catcheside-Warrington
Catcheside-Warrington's Tyneside Stories & Recitations

References

External links
 Tyneside Song
 Tyneside Songs-Catcheside Warrington

English folk songs
Songs related to Newcastle upon Tyne
Northumbrian folklore
Music books